Lysinia or Lysinoe (Λυσινόη) was a town in the north of ancient Pisidia and later assigned to Pamphylia. Hierocles has the name as Lysenara (Λυσήναρα). It was located on the south of the Ascania Lacus, and west of Sagalassus.

It became the seat of a bishop; no longer a residential bishopric, it remains a titular see of the Roman Catholic Church.

Its site is located near the modern town of Karakent in Burdur Province, Turkey.

References

Populated places in Pisidia
Populated places in ancient Pamphylia
Former populated places in Turkey
Archaeological sites in Turkey
Catholic titular sees in Asia
Populated places of the Byzantine Empire
Burdur District
History of Burdur Province